King Abdulaziz Racetrack, officially named King Abdul Aziz Equestrian Square is a horse racing venue in Riyadh in Saudi Arabia. The current track opened in January 2003. The richest thoroughbred horse race, the Saudi Cup, is held at the track.

History 
The first horse racing venue in Saudi Arabia was built 1965 in the Marat district in Riyadh. The track were too small for arranging international races, and were eventually moved to Riyadh Janadria, under supervision of Abdullah bin Abdul Aziz, the heir apparent of Saudi Arabia at the time. The new track was completed in January 2003, and was officially named King Abdul Aziz Equestrian Square. It is also the largest horse racing venue in Saudi Arabia.

Races are held at the track during September to April.

The track 
The venues main track is a 2000-meter dirt track, with a width of 24 meters. The races are run counter-clockwise. In January 2020, an 1800-meter turf track was added to the venue.

Races 
The tracks biggest race is since 2020, the Saudi Cup, which qualifies as the richest thoroughbred horse race in the world, with a $20 million purse.

Group 1 
Saudi Cup - dirt 1,800m

Group 3 
Neom Turf Cup - turf 2,100m
1351 Turf Sprint - turf 1,351m
Red Sea Turf Handicap - turf 3,000m
Riyadh Dirt Sprint - dirt 1,200m
Saudi Derby - dirt 1,600m 3yo

other races 
Saudi International Handicap - turf 2,100m, for non International Cataloguing Standards Committee part I countries and regions
International Jockey Challenge Cup - jockeys competition

References 

2003 in Saudi Arabia
Sports venues completed in 2003
Sport in Saudi Arabia
Horse racing venues in Saudi Arabia